New Time was a Chilean evangelical Christian conservative political party. It was officially recognized by the Electoral Service of Chile (Servel) on 10 July 2019. It was located in the Arica y Parinacota, Tarapacá and Antofagasta regions. The party was dissolved in February 2022 because it did not receive at least 5% of the votes in the 2021 parliamentary elections to maintain its legality.

References

External links
Nuevo Tiempo 

2016 establishments in Chile
Conservative parties in Chile
Evangelicalism in Chile
Political parties established in 2016
Protestant political parties
Social conservative parties
Political parties disestablished in 2022